Süpercan is a third person Action-adventure game. The game was developed by Sobee and published by TTÇocuk on May, 2011. Süpercan was first announced in November 2009. Süpercan has been shortlisted at the European Excellence Awards 2011. And closed in 2017.

Süpercan reached 2 million players in 8 months. Marvel Entertainment granted the right to use their superheroes in this game. A cosplay was arranged by Marvel Entertainment, Turkish Airlines and Turkish Telekom where the superheroes Spiderman, Hulk, Iron Man, Captain America and more arrived through the airport to meet Süpercan.

Plot
50 acres of forest are destroyed every minute on the Earth. While the robots are destroying the forests, the protagonist Süpercan tries to stop them. But game closed to everyone in 2017 because the owner of turk telekom closed the sobee studio. then sobee studios games are closed.Marvel Comics' characters help him from time to time in this fight.

References

External links
  
 Official teaser on NTV-MSNBC
 Official trailer on YouTube

2011 video games
Action-adventure games
Turkey-exclusive video games
Windows games
Windows-only games
Windows-only freeware games
3D GameStudio games